The Minnesota Owls were a Tier III Junior ice hockey team and member of the Minnesota Junior Hockey League (MnJHL). The team played their games at the David C. Johnson Arena located in Isanti, Minnesota. Prior the 2015–16 season, the Owls had joined the United States Premier Hockey League (USPHL) - Midwest Division along with majority of the other former MnJHL teams. However, on September 1, 2015, they announced on their website that the team had gone dormant for the season.

The Owls are a non-profit corporation and sanctioned by USA Hockey.

History 
Founded in 1993 by Dick Jenkins, the team was originally known as the North Metro Owls in the Minnesota Junior Hockey League (MnJHL). The team was reorganized before the 1997–98 season, renaming to the current Minnesota Owls.

The Owls won the MnJHL playoffs in 1994 and 1998; placed second in 1995, 1996, 2000, 2001, 2007 and 2008; placed third in 1997. As a result, the Owls went on to represent the MnJHL at the USA Hockey Tier III National Tournament.

The 2015–16 would have been the 22nd season in franchise history, but the first outside of the MnJHL as the Owls were among the 12 teams that left the MnJHL to join the United States Premier Hockey League in a new Midwest Division. The MnJHL teams were joined by all the teams from the former Midwest Junior Hockey League, former independent teams, and expansion teams to make up the fourth Tier III division under the USPHL umbrella. However, on September 1, 2015, they announced on their website that the team would go dormant prior to their first season in the USPHL-Midwest.

Season records

References

External links
 Minnesota Owls website

Ice hockey teams in Minnesota